Katherine Karen Dunn (October 24, 1945 – May 11, 2016) was a novelist, journalist, voice artist, radio personality, book reviewer, and poet from Portland, Oregon. She is best known for her novel Geek Love (1989). She was also a prolific writer on boxing.

Early life
Dunn was born in Garden City, Kansas, in 1945. She was the second-youngest of five siblings; her father left before she was two. Her mother, Velma Golly, an artist from North Dakota, married a mechanic or/and fisherman from the Pacific Northwest. The family moved often during her childhood. She went to high school in Tigard, Oregon, and later attended Reed College in Portland on a full scholarship, but never graduated. She suffered a difficult childhood due to poverty and a violent mother. She left home for good when she was 17. Poverty was an important element in her novels as well. In college she majored in philosophy and then psychology.

Later Life and Career
Dunn began her first novel Attic (1970) while studying at Reed College. During a Christmas break trip to Ashbury Heights in 1967 she met a man she would spend the next ten years with. Together, they traveled to Mexico, Boston, Newfoundland, and Seville, where she finished Attic, then to Karpathos. Here, she finished her second novel, Truck (1971), and became pregnant. She gave birth to her son in Dublin, Ireland. After living for seven years at various locations, they returned to Portland to stay "because there was a good alternative public school", namely the Metropolitan Learning Center. She settled in the Nob Hill neighborhood, where she resided until her death.

Dunn waited tables in the morning before her son woke up, and tended bars at night, painted houses, and did voice-over work. In the 1970s, she hosted a radio show on Portland's community radio station KBOO, during which she read short fiction by other authors. She taught advanced classes in creative writing at Oregon's Lewis & Clark College and a graduate course in the same subject at Pacific University in Forest Grove, Oregon.

In 1981, Dunn began writing about boxing in Willamette Week. Having fallen in love with the sport, she went on to cover the sport for a number of publications, including PDXS, The Oregonian, and The New York Times. She has been described as "one of the better boxing writers in the United States". She started boxing training in her 40s.

She was an editor and contributor for the online boxing magazine cyberboxingzone.com. In the 1990s, Dunn wrote a regular column on boxing for PDXS , in which she at one time provided detailed criticism of Evander Holyfield's sportsmanship in his controversial fight with Mike Tyson. She won the Dorothea Lange—Paul Taylor Award in 2004 for her work on School of Hard Knocks: The Struggle for Survival in America's Toughest Boxing Gyms. Her essays on boxing were collected in her 2009 collection  One Ring Circus: Dispatches from the World of Boxing.

Her third published novel was Geek Love (1989), and it was by far her best-known work. It was a finalist for the National Book Award. It was a finalist, also, for the Bram Stoker Award for first horror novel. Dunn described her memory of when she began writing it in the late 1970s, walking to Portland's Washington Park Rose Garden, contemplating nature versus nurture and the genesis of the book with its publication in 1989. It remains a strong seller, with over a half-million copies sold, never having gone out of print.

In 1989, Dunn announced that she was working on a new novel, entitled The Cut Man. As of 1999, she was still working on the project. In 2008, it was reported that publisher Alfred A. Knopf had scheduled The Cut Man for release in September. The novel remains unpublished. An excerpt was published in the summer 2010 issue of The Paris Review under the title "Rhonda Discovers Art". 

In 2012, Dunn reunited with Paul Pomerantz, her boyfriend from Reed College, and they married. Dunn died on May 11, 2016. Her son stated her death was from complications of lung cancer.

Posthumous Publications
In 2022, the third novel she wrote, Toad (1971), with an Introduction by Molly Crabapple, was published posthumously by Farrar, Straus and Giroux, making it her fourth published novel. (Thus, it was written about 18 years before Geek Love.) Harper and Row, who published her novels Attic and Truck, also bought the rights to this as well in 1971. However, they ultimately did not publish it. (“Nobody in this book is likable!” she was told.) It is about “a woman who has retreated into a life of isolation following a breakdown reflects on her time as an impoverished college student in the early 1970s in Portland, Oregon at the height of the women’s liberation movement, and the group of wealthy trust fund kids she befriends.” It was rejected by other publishers in years following, and after 1979 she set the book aside. It was only published because it was found in her archives at Lewis & Clark College by Naomi Huffman, an editor. Dunn's son and others pushed to have this work finally published.

A short story related to Toad, "The Resident Poet" was published by The New Yorker in 2020. Another short story, "The Education of Mrs. R." was published by The Paris Review in 2022. A book of her short stories is also due to be published.

Bibliography

Fiction

Novels
 Attic (1970)
 Truck (1971)
 Geek Love (1989)
 Toad (1 November 2022)

Short Stories
 3 day fox : a tattoo (1979) (chapbook)
 "The Resident Poet" - published in The New Yorker on May 11, 2020
 "The Education of Mrs. R." - published in The Paris Review Fall 2022 issue
 Short story collection, title TBA (Fall 2022)

Nonfiction
 The Slice: Information with an Attitude (1989)
  Just as Fierce. Mother Jones. Nov/Dec 1994.
 Call of the Wild. Vogue. June 1995.
 Death Scenes: A Homicide Detective's Scrapbook (1996) (linking text for photography collection) 
 
 One Ring Circus: Dispatches from the World of Boxing (2009)

References

External links

On the Beauty of Violence. Mateo Hoke interviews Katherine Dunn June 9, 2009, Guernica Magazine about her new book One Ring Circus
What the Hell Ever Happened to... Katherine Dunn? LitReactor, 2012
Katherine Dunn in The Encyclopedia of Science Fiction
'Geek Love' Author Katherine Dunn Dies at 70  May 16, 2016, NPR, All Things Considered.
Geek Love Author Katherine Dunn Dies at 70 Dan Kois, May 12, 2016, Slate.com
“Geek Love” author Katherine Dunn dead at 70 Washington Post, Associated Press, 13 May 2016
Katherine Dunn has died; the 'Geek Love' author once took the world by storm, Carolyn Kellogg, May 12, 2016, Washington POst

1945 births
2016 deaths
People from Garden City, Kansas
Novelists from Oregon
20th-century American novelists
Journalists from Portland, Oregon
Reed College alumni
Lewis & Clark College faculty
People from Tigard, Oregon
21st-century American novelists
American radio personalities
American women novelists
American women poets
American women journalists
Women science fiction and fantasy writers
20th-century American women writers
21st-century American women writers
20th-century American poets
21st-century American poets
American women sportswriters
20th-century American non-fiction writers
21st-century American non-fiction writers
Weird fiction writers
American women academics